John Steven "Steve" Tyson is a Republican member of the North Carolina House of Representatives who has represented the 3rd district (including parts of Craven County) since 2021. Tyson previously served in the United States Army from 1973 to 1976.

Electoral history

Committee assignments

2021-2022 session
Commerce (Vice Chair)
Education - Community Colleges
Finance (Vice Chair)
Health
Insurance
Transportation

References

External links

Living people
Year of birth missing (living people)
Republican Party members of the North Carolina House of Representatives
21st-century American politicians